Jashore University of Science and Technology, commonly known and abbreviated as JUST, is a government-financed public university in Bangladesh. JUST is located at Sadhinata Sarak in Jessore Sadar Upazila. Its postal code is Jashore-7408.

It is the fourth public university in Khulna Division, and the first public university in Jashore. It was established in 2007 and started four-year undergraduate courses from the 2009–2010 session. It was previously known as Jessore Science and Technology University.

History
Jashore University of Science and Technology (JUST) opened in 2008, during the 2008-2009 session. The first batch of JUST started on 10 June 2009. The first four departments were Computer Science & Engineering (CSE), Environmental Science & Technology (EST), Microbiology (MB), and Fisheries and Marine Bioscience (FMB).

In 2009, JUST added Nutrition & Food Technology (NFT), Industrial & Production Engineering (IPE), Chemical Engineering (ChE), Petroleum & Mining Engineering (PME), and Genetic Engineering & Biotechnology (GEBT). In 2010, the Pharmacy department was created. In 2012 Electrical and Electronic Engineering (EEE) and Physical Education and Sports Science (PESS) were added.

2013 brought four new departments: Physics, Chemistry, Mathematics & Statistics, and English. Accounting and Information Systems and Agro Product Processing Technology were introducted in the academic year 2015–16. In the academic year 2016–2017, the Biomedical Engineering (BME) program began.

Three new departments were established in the 2017–18 academic year: Finance &  Banking, Management and Textile Engineering (TE). The Marketing and Physiotherapy & Rehabilitation departments opened in the academic year 2018–19.

List of vice-chancellors 

 Prof. Anwar Hossain ( present )

Academics

Academic calendar
The academic year and session is generally divided into two semesters. One semester is composed of 18 and a half weeks and each week consists of 5 working days. The session usually starts after completion of the second semester. A full-time undergraduate course consists of four sessions or eight semesters. A regular examination is held at the end of each semester besides class tests for continuous assessment of progress

Faculties and departments
The university's 26 departments are organised into 7 faculties.

A total 42 additional seats are reserved for the students under the categories of son/daughter of Freedom Fighter (30 seats), Indigenous (6 seats) and Disabled (6 seats). For these seats, a student needs to provide proof by using their related certificate to authority. Once the certificate is received in the mentioned period, after verification, the student will be considered for the reserved seats.

MS programs

 M.Sc.Engg. / M.Engg. in electrical & electronic engineering (EEE)  
 MSc Engg. / M.Engg. in computer science & engineering (CSE)
 M.Sc. Engg. / M.Engg. in industrial & production engineering (IPE)
 MSc.Engg. / M.Engg. in chemical engineering (Ch.E)
 M.Sc. Engg. / M.Engg. in biomedical engineering (BME)
 M.Sc. Engg. / M.Engg. in petroleum and mining engineering (PME)
 MS in agro product processing technology (APPT) 
 MS in environmental science & technology (EST)
 MS in microbiology (MB)
 MS in fisheries & marine bio-science (FMB)
 MS in genetic engineering and biotechnology (GEBT)
 MS in physics (PHY)
 MS in mathematics (Math)
 MS in chemistry (Chem)
 Master of Pharmacy (M.Pharm.)
 MA in English

Facilities

Residence halls

Shaheed Moshiur Rahman Hall
This is a five-story building with a capacity for five hundred students. Like at other public universities in Bangladesh, there are many facilities available for the residential students, such as a TV room, a reading room, a gymnasium and a canteen.

Sheikh Hasina Student Hall

This is also a five-story, female-only building with a capacity for five hundred students. This residence hall has the same facilities available to students as Shaheed Moshiur Rahman Hall. Additionally, it has photocopying, printing, and laundry facilities for residents. The students and the organizing committee put together different game competitions from time to time.

Two additional students halls, Munshi Meherullah Hall for boys and Taramon Bibi Hall for girls, are under construction. Soon,those halls will be ready and opened for students.

Central Library
Jashore University of Science and Technology has a six-story library. Currently, there are approximately 30,000 books and 100 journals available for students and faculty members. New books are added to the collection every month. Students or faculty members can study and borrow books from the library. It is open from 9 am to 8 pm Saturday through Wednesday. An E-library service is also available.

TSC and cafeteria
This is a two-story building, located at the west-eastern corner of the campus. The cafeteria is on the ground floor and TSC is on the first floor. The food supplies come from a charity organization, the Jagannath Foundation.

Dormitory and tower
The JUST dormitory is located at south-eastern corner of the campus. This five-storied dormitory is available for the faculty members and administrative staff of JUST. There is also a ten-story Madhumati tower for the faculty members and administrative staff of the university.

Central mosque
The central mosque, located on the west side of the campus, serves as a place of prayer for Muslim students and employees.

References

External links
 Official website

2007 establishments in Bangladesh
Educational institutions established in 2007
Jashore District
Public universities of Bangladesh
Universities of science and technology in Bangladesh
Organisations based in Khulna